Fernando González and Martín Rodríguez were the defending champions, but did not participate this year.

David Škoch and Tomáš Zíb won in the final 6–4, 6–3, against Lukáš Dlouhý and Pavel Vízner.

Seeds

Draw

Draw

External links
Draw

2006 ATP Tour
2006 Open de Tenis Comunidad Valenciana